Taonius is a small genus of glass squid. Although it comprises only three recognised species, it has been suggested there may be as many as five species. Taonius borealis is found in the North Pacific Ocean and Taonius pavo is found in the Atlantic and possibly SW Indian Ocean.

Some teuthologists dispute Voss's synonymy of Belonella with Taonius.

The genus contains bioluminescent species.

Species
Three species are currently placed in Taonius:

Taonius borealis  (Nesis, 1972)
Taonius belone (Chun, 1906)
Taonius pavo  (Lesueur, 1821)

References

External links

Tree of Life web project: Taonius

Squid
Cephalopod genera
Bioluminescent molluscs